Flatstyle refers to several 20th-century American Indian painting styles with limited or no shading or perspective but emphasized shape and contour. These include:

 Bacone school, popularized by Bacone College, Muskogee, Oklahoma from the 1930s through 1980s
 San Ildefonso School, active in New Mexico from the 1910s through 1940s
 Southern Plains style, popularized by the Kiowa Six, beginning in the late 1920s.
 Studio style, taught by Dorothy Dunn and Géronima Montoya Cruz at the Santa Fe Indian School, New Mexico, from the 1930s to early 1960s.